Ludo srce is the debut studio album by Serbian pop star Katarina Živković. It was released 13 April 2013 through Grand Production.

Track listing

Personnel

Instruments

Aleksandar Sofronijević – accordion (8)
Goran Radinović – accordion, keyboards (6)
Dejan Kostić – backing vocals (7)
Ivana Selakov – backing vocals (7)
Ksenija Milošević – backing vocals (6)
Mirjana Aleksić – backing vocals (8)
Nemanja Mijatović – violin (8)

Production and recording

Ivan Lekić – engineering (8)
Vladimir Aleksić – guitar, bouzouki, bass (6)
Goran Radinović – programming (6)

Crew

Dragan ŠuhART – design
Vanja Pantin – styling
Dejan Milićević – photography

References

2013 albums
Grand Production albums